Yamal-102 was a geostationary communications satellite operated by Gazkom and built by RSC Energia. It was, along with Yamal-101 the first communications satellite of the Yamal programme and the first iteration of the USP Bus. It was a  satellite with 2200 watts of power (1300 watts available for the payload) on an unpressurized bus. It had eight SPT-70 electric thrusters by OKB Fakel for station keeping. Its payload was 12 C-band equivalent transponders supplied by Space Systems/Loral.

History 
It was launched along Yamal-101 on 6 September 1999 at 16:36:00 UTC from Baikonur Site 81/23 by a Proton-K / Blok DM-2M directly to geostationary orbit. While its twin Yamal-101 failed, Yamal-102 successfully deployed and was commissioned into service. On 9 August 2010, it was decommissioned and sent to a graveyard orbit. The satellite lasted 11 years and 2 months, a bit short of the design life of 12 years.

Rename to Yamal-101 
Right after solar panel deployment Yamal-101 failed irreparably. Thus, Gazprom Space Systems registered Yamal-102 as Yamal-101. This has caused significant confusion but the records are clear that the satellite that failed was, in fact, the original Yamal-101.

See also 

 Yamal 101 – Twin satellite that was launched together and failed at separation
 Yamal – Communication satellite family operated by Gazprom Space Systems
 Gazprom Space Systems – Satellite communication division of the Russian oil giant Gazprom
 USP Bus – The satellite bus on which Yamal-101 is based
 RSC Energia – The designer and manufacturer of the Yamal-101 satellite

References

External links 
 Gunter Space Page on the Yamal-101, -102

Yamal-102
Satellites using the USP bus
Spacecraft launched in 1999
1999 in Russia
Spacecraft launched by Proton rockets